Shaun Keeling (born 21 January 1987) is a South African rower. He won a silver medal in the men's coxless pair event at the 2016 Summer Olympics. He also competed in the men's coxless pair event at the 2008 Summer Olympics.

References

External links
 

1987 births
Living people
People from Krugersdorp
South African male rowers
Olympic rowers of South Africa
Rowers at the 2008 Summer Olympics
Rowers at the 2016 Summer Olympics
Place of birth missing (living people)
Medalists at the 2016 Summer Olympics
Olympic silver medalists for South Africa
Olympic medalists in rowing
African Games silver medalists for South Africa
African Games medalists in rowing
World Rowing Championships medalists for South Africa
Competitors at the 2007 All-Africa Games
Sportspeople from Gauteng
21st-century South African people